The 2010 Northeast Conference baseball tournament began on May 20 and ended on May 22, 2010, at TD Bank Ballpark in Bridgewater, New Jersey.  The league's top four teams competed in the double elimination tournament.  Second-seeded  won their fourth tournament championship and earned the Northeast Conference's automatic bid to the 2010 NCAA Division I baseball tournament.

Seeding and format
The top four finishers were seeded one through four based on conference regular-season winning percentage. Bryant was ineligible for postseason play, as it completed its transition to Division I.

Bracket

All-Tournament Team
The following players were named to the All-Tournament Team.

Most Valuable Player
Pat Epps was named Tournament Most Valuable Player.  Epps was a Junior outfielder for Central Connecticut.

References

Tournament
Northeast Conference Baseball Tournament
Northeast Conference baseball tournament
Northeast Conference baseball tournament